In geometry, the tridiminished icosahedron is one of the Johnson solids. The name refers to one way of constructing it, by removing three pentagonal pyramids from a regular icosahedron, which replaces three sets of five triangular faces from the icosahedron with three mutually adjacent pentagonal faces.

Related polytopes
The tridiminished icosahedron is the vertex figure of the snub 24-cell, a uniform 4-polytope (4-dimensional polytope).

See also
Diminished icosahedron (J11)
Metabidiminished icosahedron (J62)

External links

Johnson solids